Derek Nash may refer to:

 Derek Nash (soccer), American soccer player
 Derek Nash (musician) (born 1961), British jazz saxophonist